Nina Pavlovna Grebeshkova (born 29 November 1930) is a Russian actress. Since 1953 she has performed in more than thirty films. She was married to film director Leonid Gaidai.

In 1954 graduated from Gerasimov Institute of Cinematography (workshop of Vladimir Belokurov and Vasili Vanin).

In 1954-1990 she was an actress of the National Film Actors' Theatre.

Selected filmography

References

External links

1930 births
20th-century Russian actresses
21st-century Russian actresses
Living people
Actresses from Moscow
Gerasimov Institute of Cinematography alumni
Honored Artists of the Russian Federation
Russian film actresses
Russian voice actresses
Soviet film actresses

Soviet voice actresses